Singhraj Adhana (born 26 January 1982 in Faridabad, Haryana), known mononymously as Singhraj, is an Indian paralympian and shooter. He won a silver medal in the Mixed 50m pistol SH1 and a bronze medal in the Men's P1 10 metre air pistol SH1 at the 2020 Summer Paralympics.

Career achievements 

 Gold medal in P4 Team and Silver in P4 Individual events in Chateauroux World Cup 2018, France
 Bronze medal in P4 of Para Asian Games 2018 in Jakarta, Indonesia.
 Gold medal in Pl team event and a silver medal in P4 individual event at Al Ain World Cup 2019, UAE.
 Two Gold in P1, P4 team events and 2 Bronzes in P4 individual and P6 Team events in Osijek World Cup 2019.
 Bronze medal in P4 team event in Sydney World Championship 2019, Australia.
 Gold medal in P1,Silver in P4 team event and Bronze in P4 individual event in Al Ain World Cup 2021 held in UAE.
 Bronze medal in P1 10 metre air pistol SH1 at the 2020 Summer Paralympics.
Silver medal in Mixed 50m pistol SH1 at the 2020 Summer Paralympics.

Education 
 According to various sources he was a student in class 9th at Rawal Convent School, Rawal Educational Society chaired by Mr. Anil Rawal. 
 He with Manish Narwal was appreciated at Rawal International School, Saroorpur industrial region, Faridabad on 18-9-2021 for bringing the achievements to India by Mr. CB Rawal.

See also 
 India at the 2020 Summer Paralympics
 Shooting at the 2018 Asian Para Games

References 

Living people
People from Faridabad
Indian male sport shooters
Paralympic shooters of India
Shooters at the 2020 Summer Paralympics
Paralympic silver medalists for India
Paralympic bronze medalists for India
Medalists at the 2020 Summer Paralympics
Paralympic medalists in shooting
1982 births
Recipients of the Arjuna Award